The lingula of the mandible is a prominent bony ridge on the medial side of the mandible. It is next to the mandibular foramen. It gives attachment to the sphenomandibular ligament.

Structure 
The lingula of the mandible is a prominent bony ridge on the medial side of the mandible. It is next to the mandibular foramen. It has a notch from which the mylohyoid groove originates. It gives attachment to the sphenomandibular ligament.

Variation 
The lingula of the mandible can take many shapes, including triangular, truncated, and nodular. In a majority of people, this shape is symmetrical.

See also 
 Lingula

References

External links 
 http://ect.downstate.edu/courseware/haonline/labs/l22/os2009.htm
 
 

Bones of the head and neck